Ujhani is an industry-based city and a municipal board in Badaun district in the Indian state of Uttar Pradesh.

Geography
It has an average elevation of 192 metres (630 feet).

Demographics
 India census, Ujhani had a population of near about 126,000. Males constitute 56% of the population and females 44%. Ujhani has an average literacy rate of 87%, higher than the national average of 74%: male literacy is 88%, and female literacy is 86%. In Ujhani, 15% of the population is under 6 years of age.

Location
Ujhani lies on SH33 (Bareilly-Mathura)
SH18 originates from here known as Budaun-Meerut or Budaun-Delhi Highway.

Politics
BILSI (Assembly constituency) is the Vidhan Sabha constituency. BADAUN (Lok Sabha constituency) is the parliamentary constituency.

Education

Ujhani is a small town connected to many rural areas. Many children from the villages come here to get education. In recent times with great emphasis on education, there have been many schools and colleges that are being established here.

Distance
Budaun (city) - ,  (centre)
Kasganj 
Bareilly 
Mathura 
Delhi

See also
Bitroi

References

Cities and towns in Budaun district
Blocks in Budaun District